West Mesa High School (WMHS) is a public senior high school in Albuquerque, New Mexico, located on the city's West Mesa. It is a part of the Albuquerque Public Schools. The school colors are scarlet, royal blue and white, and their mascot is the Mustang.

Academics

Student body statistics

Films shot on Campus

 The 1971 drama Making It was filmed in the summer of 1970.
 The 2008 comedy Hamlet 2 was filmed from September through October 2007.
 The 2011 musical drama Lemonade Mouth was filmed in the spring of 2010.

Athletics

WMHS competes in the New Mexico Activities Association (NMAA), as a class 6A school in District 5. In 2014, the NMAA realigned the state's schools in to six classifications and adjusted district boundaries. In addition to West Mesa High School, the schools in District 5-6A include: Albuquerque High School, Rio Grande High School, Valley High School and Atrisco Heritage Academy High School.

WMHS has captured 12 State Championships, most in AAAA.

Notable alumni

Randy Castillo (1968), rock drummer
Jordan Espinosa, state champion wrestler; current mixed martial artist for the UFC
Sandy R. Jones, former member of the New Mexico Public Regulation Commission
Damacio Page, state champion wrestler; current mixed martial artist, formerly for the WEC and the UFC
Steven Michael Quezada (1981), actor, writer, producer, comedian, and politician
Al Unser Jr. (1980), race car driver
 Joey Villasenor (attended) mixed martial artist

Footnotes

High schools in Albuquerque, New Mexico
Public high schools in New Mexico